The Global Footprint Network was founded in 2003 and is an independent think tank originally based in the United States, Belgium and Switzerland. It was established as a charitable not-for-profit organization in each of those three countries. Its aim is to develop and promote tools for advancing sustainability, including the ecological footprint and biocapacity, which measure the amount of resources we use and how much we have. These tools aim at bringing ecological limits to the center of decision-making.

Work 
Global Footprint Network's goal is to create a future where all humans can live well, within the means of one planet Earth.  The organization is headquartered in Oakland, California. The Network brings together over 70 partner organizations, including WWF International, ICLEI, Bank Sarasin, The Pictet Group, the New Economics Foundation, Pronatura México, and the Environment Agency Abu Dhabi.

National Footprint and Biocapacity Accounts 
Every year, Global Footprint Network produced a new edition of its National Footprint and Biocapacity Accounts, which calculate Ecological Footprint and biocapacity of more than 200 countries and territories from 1961 to the present. Based on up to 15,000 data points per country per year, these data have been used to influence policy in more than a dozen countries, including Ecuador, France, Germany, Japan, Korea, the Philippines, Russia, Switzerland, and the United Arab Emirates. Since 2019, the National Footprint and Biocapacity Accounts are produced in collaboration between Global Footprint Network, York University, and Footprint Data Foundation.

The 2022 Edition of the National Footprint and Biocapacity Accounts cover 1961-2018 (latest UN data available), and incorporate data from the Food and Agriculture Organization, the UN Comtrade database, the International Energy Agency, and over 20 other sources.

Ecological Footprint Explorer 
In April 2017, Global Footprint Network launched the Ecological Footprint Explorer, an open data platform for the National Footprint and Biocapacity Accounts. The website provides ecological footprint results for over 200 countries and territories, and encourages researchers, analysts, and decision-makers to visualize and download data.

Earth Overshoot Day 
Previously known as Ecological Debt Day, Earth Overshoot Day is the day when humanity has exhausted nature's budget for the year. For the rest of the year, society operates in ecological overshoot by drawing down local resource stocks and accumulating carbon dioxide in the atmosphere. The first Earth Overshoot Day was December 19, 1987. In 2014, Earth Overshoot Day was August 19. The Earth Overshoot Day in 2015 was on August 13 and on August 8 in 2016.  In 2017, Earth Overshoot Day landed on August 2, and in 2020 on August 22.

Founding 
In 2003, Mathis Wackernagel, PhD, and Susan Burns founded Global Footprint Network, an international think-tank headquartered in Oakland, California, with offices in Geneva and Brussels. Wackernagel received an honorary doctorate in December 2007 from the University of Bern in Switzerland.

Leadership 
 Co-Founder & President: Dr. Mathis Wackernagel
 Co-Founder: Susan Burns
 Chief Executive Officer: Laurel Hanscom
 Chief Science Officer: Dr. David Lin
 Director, Marketing & Communications: Amanda Diep
 Director, Mediterranean and MENA Regions: Dr. Alessandro Galli
 Board Chair: Keith Tuffley
 Honorary Chair: Swiss entrepreneur and investor André Hoffmann

Awards and honours 
 World Sustainability Award 2018
 International Association for Impact Assessment's Global Environment Award 2015
 RECYCLAPOLIS National Sustainability Award 2015
 ISSP Sustainability Hall of Fame Inductees Susan Burns and Mathis Wackernagel 2014
 Prix Nature Swisscanto 2013
 Global Footprint Network was recognized as one of the top 100 NGOs worldwide by the Global Journal in 2012 and 2013.
 Blue Planet Prize 2012
 Boulding Award 2012
 Binding Prize 2012

See also 
 Ecological footprint
 Carrying capacity
 Demography
Human overpopulation
 New Economics Foundation
 Sustainable development

References and further reading

External links 
 
 
 

International research institutes
Sustainability organizations
International sustainability organizations
Organizations established in 2003
Organizations promoting population moderation
Environmental organizations based in the United States
Population organizations